Narzary, Narjinari or Narjinary is one of the most common surname amongst the Boro community of Assam, India.

Notable people
People with surname Narzary who may or may not belong to this specific community
 Halicharan Narzary, Indian footballer.
 Bilifang Nazary, Indian footballer.
 Kamal Singh Narzary, a member of Assam Legislative Assembly
 Majendra Narzary, Indian politician
 Kanakeswar Narzary, Indian politician

See also 
Bodo people
Bodo Sahitya Sabha
Bodo language
Basumatary

References

Occupational surnames
Surnames of Indian origin
Bodo-language surnames